War Front may refer to:
 War Front: Turning Point, a computer game
 War Front (horse) (foaled 2002), American Thoroughbred racehorse
 Warfront, a war comic published by Harvey Comics

See also
 Battlefront (disambiguation)